Cyathochitina is an extinct genus of chitinozoans. It was described by Alfred Eisenack in 1955.

Species
 Cyathochitina angusta Nõlvak et Grahn, 1993
 Cyathochitina calix (Eisenack, 1931)
 Cyathochitina campanulaeformis (Eisenack, 1931)
 Cyathochitina costata Grahn, 1982
 Cyathochitina giraffa Grahn et Nõlvak, 2010
 Cyathochitina hunderumensis Grahn, Nõlvak et Paris, 1996
 Cyathochitina jagovalensis Schallreuter, 1981
 Cyathochitina kuckersiana (Eisenack, 1934)
 Cyathochitina latipatagium Jenkins, 1969
 Cyathochitina patagiata Jenkins, 1969
 Cyathochitina primitiva Szaniawski, 1974
 Cyathochitina regnelli Eisenack, 1955
 Cyathochitina sebyensis Grahn, 1981
 Cyathochitina? clepsydra Grahn, 1984

References

Prehistoric marine animals
Fossil taxa described in 1955